Canada has 20 major ecosystems -- ecozones, comprising 15 terrestrial units and 5 marine units. These ecozones are further subdivided into 53 ecoprovinces, 194 ecoregions, and 1,027 ecodistricts. These form the country's  ecological land classification within the Ecological Land Classification framework adopted in 2017. They represent areas of the earth's surface representative of large and very generalized ecological units characterized by interactive and adjusting biotic and abiotic factors.

Terrestrial ecozones

On November 20, 2017, Statistics Canada approved the Ecological Land Classification (ELC) framework as the official government standard in classifying the ecological regions of Canada. This framework mirrors that which was originally established in 1995, but revises number of ecodisiricts to 1,027 in order to better align them with the Soil Landscapes of Canada (SLC) database of Agriculture and Agri-Food Canada. Though this framework originally included 5 marine ecozones, these were never formally adopted by Statistics Canada.
It is based on a hierarchy with ecosystems nested within ecosystems. The Ecological
Framework for Canada defines four levels of ecosystems as a nested hierarchy of
areas:
Ecozones
 Ecoprovinces
 Ecoregions
 Ecodistricts

Marine ecozones
Canada is divided into 5 marine ecozones based upon the National Ecological Framework for Canada established by the Ecological Stratification Working Group in 1995 in accordance with the requirements of the CEC. The Canadian marine ecozones adjoin to each other, except for the Pacific ecozone which is adjacent to international marine ecozones and terrestrial Canadian ecozones. The largest is the Arctic Archipelago, which actually extends to subarctic regions.

History

Ecological Framework of Canada 1995
In 1991, a collaborative project was undertaken by a number of federal agencies in cooperation with provincial and territorial governments to establish a common ecological framework for Canada. The resulting report, A National Ecological Framework for Canada, released by the Ecological Stratification Working Group in 1995, established the 20 ecozones (15 terrestrial and 5 marine), 194 ecoregions, and 1,031 ecodistricts of Canada. A second report published in 1999 established the 53 ecoprovinces of Canada in accordance with the requirements of the Commission for Environmental Cooperation (CEC).

Further developments
In 2009, Fisheries and Oceans Canada developed the 13 federal marine bioregions of Canada as the official spatial planning framework in classifying and preserving the ecological integrity of Canada's internal waters and exclusive economic zone.

In 2010, Environment Canada published the report Canadian Biodiversity: Ecosystem Status and Trends 2010 utilizing a modified hierarchy called "Ecozone+". Major modifications included adjustments to terrestrial boundaries to reflect improvements in ground truthing, the combining of three Arctic ecozones, and the addition of two ecoprovinces (Western Interior Basin and Newfoundland Boreal) and nine marine ecosystem-based units.

Canadian Ecological Framework 2014
In 2014, the Canadian Council on Ecological Areas (CCEA) released an update to the first digital version of the Canadian Ecological Framework (CEF). The new spatial framework was designed to replace the 1995 ecological framework as well as the Ecozone+ framework used in the Canadian Biodiversity: Ecosystem Status and Trends 2010 Report. This new ecozone map includes 18 terrestrial, 12 marine and 1 freshwater ecozone, the latter two of which were derived from the marine bioregions outlined by Fisheries and Oceans Canada in 2009.

This comprehensive framework is currently in use by Environment and Climate Change Canada to determine protected area coverage of Canada's ecozones.

See also

List of ecoregions in North America (CEC)
List of ecoregions in the United States (EPA)
Forests of Canada#Regions

References

External links
 Parks Canada (2003), Terrestrial Ecozones of Canada 

 
 
ecozones
Ecozones